Megachile seraxensis is a species of bee in the family Megachilidae. It was described by Radoszkowski in 1893.

References

Seraxensis
Insects described in 1893